Raatti Stadium is a multi-purpose stadium in the Koskikeskus neighbourhood of Oulu, Finland. It is currently used mostly for football matches and the stadium holds 4,392 people. It was opened in 1953 and renovated in 2009–2011.

References 

Football venues in Finland
Multi-purpose stadiums in Finland
Sports venues in Oulu
Koskikeskus
Sports venues completed in 1953